Store and forward is a telecommunications technique in which information is sent to an intermediate station where it is kept and sent at a later time to the final destination or to another intermediate station. The intermediate station, or node in a networking context, verifies the integrity of the message before forwarding it. In general, this technique is used in networks with intermittent connectivity, especially in the wilderness or environments requiring high mobility. It may also be preferable in situations when there are long delays in transmission and variable and high error rates, or if a direct, end-to-end connection is not available.

Modern store and forward networking 
 Store and forward originates with delay-tolerant networks. No real-time services are available for these kinds of networks.
 Logistical Networking is a scalable form of store and forward networking that exposes network-embedded buffers on intermediate nodes and allows flexible creation of  services by higher-level managers including caching, point-to-multipoint communication (or multicast), content delivery and many other stateful distributed services. Real time services can be created using logistical networking when data transfer connectivity permits.

A store-and-forward switching center is a message switching center in which a message is accepted from the originating user, i.e., sender, when it is offered, held in a physical storage, and forwarded to the destination user, i.e., receiver, in accordance with the priority placed upon the message by the originating user and the availability of an outgoing channel.

Store and forward switching centers are usually implemented in mobile service stations where the messages that are sent from the sender is first sent to these centers. If the destination address isn't available, then the center stores this message and tries sending it later. This improves the probability of the message to be delivered.  In the other case, if the destination is available at that time, then the message is immediately sent.

Manually operated relay 
Store and forward networks predate the use of computers. Point-to-point teleprinter equipment was used to send messages which were stored at the receiving end on punched paper tape at a relay center. A human operator at the center removed the message tape from the receiving machine, read the addressing information, and then sent it toward its destination on appropriate outbound point-to-point teleprinter link. If the outbound link was in use, the operator placed the message in tape in a physical queue, usually consisting of a set of clips or hooks. A major relay center in the mid 1900s might have dozens of inbound and outbound teleprinters, scores of operators, and thousands of messages in the queues during peak periods. Operators referred to these centers as "torn-tape relay centers," a reference to removing the received message from the inbound teleprinter by tearing the paper tape to separate one message from the next. The U.S. military term for such a center was "Non-Automated Relay Center" (NARC).

Automatic relay 
In 1948, Western Union introduced Plan 55-A, the first automatic electromechanical store and forward message switching system. All message storage was performed by paper tape punches paired with paper tape readers, with a bin in between.

Email
It is very common for an email system using SMTP to accept a message, store it and then forward it on elsewhere. Although fully open mail relays are no longer common, not only does simple server-based forwarding work this way, but also many email filtering and automated electronic mailing lists services.

UUCP

Prior to the deployment of the Internet, computers were connected via a variety of point-to-point techniques, with many smaller computers using dial-up connections. The UUCP store-and-forward protocols allowed a message (typically e-mail) to move across the collection of computers and eventually reach its destination. Late in the 20th century, store and forward techniques evolved into packet switching which replaced it for most purposes.

FidoNet

FidoNet was an email store-and-forward system for bulletin board systems that peaked at 45,000 systems with millions of users across the world. The system was highly efficient, using the latest file compression and file transfer systems to aggressively drive down the cost of transmission on what was largely a hobby network. The system was later modified to support public messages (forums) called EchoMail, which grew to about 8 MB a day, compressed.

See also
Best-effort delivery
Cut-through switching
Delay-tolerant networking
Email forwarding
Fragment free
Hop-by-hop transport
Internet fax
Logistical Networking
Network switch
Packet radio
Stofor
Store and forward delay
Wormhole routing

References

Network protocols